The Chief of the General Staff of Yugoslavia refers of the chief of the General Staff of the Royal Yugoslav Army from 1918 to 1941, the Yugoslav People's Army from 1945 to 1992 and the Armed Forces of Serbia and Montenegro (officially named the Armed Forces of Yugoslavia between 1992 and 2003) from 1992 to 2006.

List of chiefs of the general staff

† denotes people who died in office.

Royal Yugoslav Army (1918–1920)

Royal Yugoslav Armed Forces (1920–1941)

Yugoslav Army Outside the Homeland (1941–1942)

Yugoslav Army in the Homeland (1942–1945)

National Liberation Army (1941–1945)

Yugoslav People's Army (1945–1992)
The Chief of the General Staff was the chief of staff of the General Staff of the Yugoslav People's Army (JNA) during its existence from 1945 to 1992. He was appointed by the President (after 1980 Presidency) of the Socialist Federal Republic of Yugoslavia, who was the commander-in-chief. While the Federal Secretary of People's Defence (defence minister) headed the Federal Secretariat of People's Defence (Savezni sekretarijat za narodnu odbranu - SSNO) and it was the most effective military person, the Chief of the General Staff (which was the formational part of SSNO) was the most professional and staff body.

Timeline

Armed Forces of Yugoslavia / Serbia and Montenegro (1992–2006)
Following the breakup of Yugoslavia and the secession of four out of six constituent republic in the SFR Yugoslavia the remaining two (Serbia and Montenegro) established a federation in 1992 called the Federal Republic of Yugoslavia (FR Yugoslavia). This lasted until 2003 when it was reconstituted as a state union called Serbia and Montenegro. In 2006 both countries declared independence and parted ways.

See also
Chiefs of Joint Staff of the Armed Forces of Bosnia and Herzegovina
Chief of the General Staff of the Armed Forces of the Republic of Croatia
Chief of the General Staff (North Macedonia)
Chief of the General Staff (Montenegro)
Chief of the Serbian General Staff
Chief of the General Staff (Slovenia)

Notes

Sources
 Chief of the General Staff: 1876–2000, Ivetić Velimir, Belgrade 2000.

Military of the Kingdom of Yugoslavia
Military of SFR Yugoslavia
Military of Serbia and Montenegro
Lists of military personnel by country
1918 establishments in Yugoslavia
2006 disestablishments in Serbia and Montenegro